Markout is an unincorporated community in Kaufman County, located in the U.S. state of Texas. According to the Handbook of Texas, the community had a population of 80 in 2000. It is located within the Dallas/Fort Worth Metroplex.

History
Markout had a Baptist church called Pleasant Grove Baptist Church, which changed its name to Markout Baptist Church until it returned to Pleasant Grove in 1980. The community had a population of 80 from the mid-1960s through 2000.

Geography

Education
Markout had a school called East Fork Academy in 1884. The school consolidated with the Forney Independent School District in 1947. The local Baptist church continued holding services there. The community continues to be served by Forney ISD today, with elementary students attending Johnson Elementary School in Forney.

References

Unincorporated communities in Kaufman County, Texas
Unincorporated communities in Texas